Churchill is a former provincial electoral division in the Canadian province of Manitoba.  It was created by redistribution in 1956, and eliminated in 1999.

During its existence, Churchill encompassed the northernmost region of the province, a vast and sparsely populated area with no major urban centres.  Most of the riding's residents were aboriginal, many living in isolated communities.

Elections in this riding were frequently deferred for logistical reasons prior to 1969.

When the riding was abolished, its territory was divided between the ridings of Rupertsland, Flin Flon and Thompson.

List of provincial representatives

Election results

1958 general election

1959 general election

1962 general election

1966 general election

1969 by-election

1969 general election

1973 general election

1977 general election

1981 general election

1986 general election

1988 general election 

Former provincial electoral districts of Manitoba
Churchill, Manitoba